Samuel Berger is the name of:

Sandy Berger (Samuel Richard Berger, 1945–2015), US politician
Sam Berger (1900–1992), Canadian industrialist
Samuel Berger (boxer) (1884–1925), American heavyweight boxer
Samuel D. Berger (1911–1980), American diplomat
Sam Berger - manager of Homestead Records from 1983 to 1984